Brig Gen Carel Laubscher  was a General Officer in the South African Army from the artillery.

Military career 

He joined as a Conscript in 1979 and was commissioned as an Officer in 1982. Adjutant at 10 Artillery Brigade. He was a Battery Commander at Sierra Battery of 61 Mechanised Battalion Group during 1989–1990. He was appointed as Commander of 14 Artillery Regiment in Jan 1991. He served as the Chief Instructor Gunnery at the School of Artillery during 1994-1996 and member of the Directing Staff at the South African Army College in 1996. Much later, he served as the SSO Force Preparation for the  Artillery Formation from 1999 to 2003, SSO Education Training & Development for the SA Army 2004–2008. SSO Quality Assurance for the SANDF at Human Resources Division in 2008. His last posting was as Director of Training Systems Integrity when he went on pension from the SANDFin 2021.

Honours and awards

Medals

Proficiency badges

References 

South African Army generals
South African military officers
Living people
1961 births
Afrikaner people
South African people of Dutch descent
South African military personnel of the Border War
National Defence College, India alumni
Stellenbosch University alumni